Carabus elysii magnificens is a subspecies of ground beetle in the subfamily Carabinae that is endemic to Henan, China. The subspecies are black coloured with either golden or bronze pronotum.

References

elysii magnificens
Beetles described in 1999
Beetles of Asia
Endemic fauna of Henan